The Ballandean Pyramid is a man-made stone pyramid near the small village of Ballandean, Queensland, Australia. The pyramid is approximately 15 metres in height and built from blocks of the local granite. (It should not be confused with the nearby natural rock formations known as the Pyramids in the Girraween National Park.) It is on private property belonging to a local vineyard (Henty Estate) and is approximately 25 metres from the nearest road.

History
The pyramid was built after a local resident, Peter Watters (Watters Vine Management Service), asked the land owner Stewart Morland what was to be done with the surplus amount of granite rocks that were excavated for land tillage, humorously suggesting that a pyramid could be constructed. Four hours later Morland decided to build the pyramid and contracted the work to Ken Stubberfield at a cost of $1000.  

The pyramid base was to be 30 metres wide. Landscaping of the base was completed early and the rocks were collected by a dump truck and brought to the site. The first three levels of rocks were laid first by a large excavator and then manoeuvred appropriately into place by a smaller excavator. As the pyramid rose, a makeshift dirt ramp was built to negotiate the height and the construction vehicles used this access ramp to complete the pyramid. At the end of construction, the ramp was removed by the excavator.

The pyramid, which weighs approximately 7500 tonnes, took eight months to build.

Regulations and maintenance
It is currently forbidden for public to climb the pyramid for any reason. The pyramid is on private property where public entry is prohibited, but it is visible from the road.

As considerable amounts of earth from the construction ramp ended up inside the pyramid, weeds and blackberry bushes have appeared on the pyramid. A small tree even germinated at the very top of the pyramid which could be seen from a distance, causing annoyance to passers-by. This was removed by hand by a vineyard worker in mid-January 2013, restoring the pyramid to its original symmetrical look.

Services
An Anzac Day service was held at the site. The Last Post was played from midway up the pyramid and a flag was posted at the top.

See also
Gympie Pyramid

References

External links

Ballandean, Queensland
Pyramids in Australia